Laura Mary Clarke  (born 3 June 1978) is the CEO of ClientEarth a global non-profit environmental law organisation. She is a former British diplomat, who served as the British High Commissioner to New Zealand, and the Governor of Pitcairn.

Biography
Clarke is the CEO of ClientEarth, having taken over from founding-CEO James Thornton.

Clarke took up her role as High Commissioner to New Zealand, and Governor of the Pitcairn Islands in January 2018. Her previous role was as the UK Government's India Co-ordinator and Head of the South Asia Department in the Foreign and Commonwealth Office. While serving in these roles she was ranked as one of the most influential people in UK-India relations. Other roles included Political Counsellor in Pretoria, South Africa, Chief of Staff to the Minister for Europe, and roles in the Ministry of Justice, British Parliament and European Commission.

Clarke served as non-Resident British High Commissioner to Samoa from March 2018 to December 2019, when the British Government established a Resident High Commission in Samoa.

In her role as High Commissioner to New Zealand, Clarke placed an emphasis on strengthening relations with Māori of New Zealand. In November 2018 the British High Commission employed its first Maori adviser and also a language teacher for Clarke. In October 2019 Clarke expressed regret, on behalf of the British Government, for the killing of 9 Māori during the first encounters with the crew of James Cook’s Endeavour.

In July 2020, Clarke launched UK-New Zealand Free Trade Agreement Negotiations alongside PM Jacinda Ardern and NZ Trade Minister David Parker.

Clarke hosted the British High Commission podcast, ‘Tea with the High Commission’, with guests including Jacinda Ardern, actor Sam Neill and comedian Eddie Izzard.

As Governor of Pitcairn, Clarke had oversight of governance and economic support for the Pitcairn Islands. She and her husband made a film of her first visit.

Clarke is married to Toby Fisher, a New Zealander, and they have three children.

She was appointed Officer of the Order of the British Empire (OBE) in the 2021 New Year Honours for services to British foreign policy.

References

Living people
21st-century British diplomats
British women ambassadors
High Commissioners of the United Kingdom to New Zealand
Governors of Pitcairn
Officers of the Order of the British Empire
1978 births